The 2017 Baylor Bears football team represented Baylor University in the 2017 NCAA Division I FBS football season. The Bears played their home games at the McLane Stadium in Waco, Texas and competed in the Big 12 Conference. They were led by first-year head coach Matt Rhule. They finished the season 1–11 (1–8 in-conference) to finish in ninth place in the Big 12.

Recruiting

Position key

Recruits

Baylor signed a total of 27 recruits.

Schedule
Baylor announced its 2017 football schedule on December 13, 2016. The 2017 schedule consisted of 6 home, 5 away and 1 neutral site game in the regular season. The Bears hosted Big 12 foes Iowa State, Oklahoma, Texas, and West Virginia, and will travel to Kansas, Kansas State, Oklahoma State, and TCU. Baylor played Texas Tech for the seventh season in a row in Arlington, Texas.

The Bears hosted two of the three non-conference opponents, Liberty from the Big South Conference and UTSA from Conference USA and travel to Duke from the Atlantic Coast Conference.

Schedule Source:

Roster

References

Baylor
Baylor Bears football seasons
Baylor Bears football